Fateh Khan Bandial was a Pakistani politician who served as Federal Interior Minister of Pakistan since 23 July 1993 to 19 October 1993. He was the father of Justice Umar Ata Bandial. He served as Deputy Commissioner of Lahore.

Death
He died on 9 November 2008 and received a eulogy from Prime Minister Yousuf Raza Gilani.

References

Interior ministers of Pakistan

2008 deaths
Year of birth missing